Argon 18 is a Canadian cycle manufacturer founded in 1989 in Montreal, Quebec. The name is derived from the element Argon, which is number 18 on the periodic table of elements. Argon 18 bikes are distributed in more than 70 countries. Argon 18 also sponsors professional cycling teams and professional triathletes.

In June 2017, they became the official supplier to Canada's national road, track and para-cycling cycling teams, through the 2020 Olympic Games.

Cycle technology 

ONEness Concept
The ONEness concept consists of an integrated aero and stemless fork/aerobar combination that is designed to be aerodynamic and ergonomic. The design extends to the frame, fork, headset, base bar and aero bars, brakes and levers as well as a reversible carbon seatpost which can be 76 or 78°.
3D Headtube
This consists of interchangeable structural spacers that extend the headtube's height.

Professional cycling teams 
Jelly Belly-Maxxis (UCI Continental Team)
Silber Pro Cycling Team (UCI Continental Team)
Champion System-Stan's NoTubes (UCI Continental Team)
Team TreFor-Blue Water (UCI Continental Team)
Team Novo Nordisk (UCI Pro Team)

Professional triathletes 

Craig Alexander
Heather Jackson
Michelle Vesterby
Eric Lagerstrom
Stephanie Roy

References 

Cycle manufacturers of Canada
Manufacturing companies based in Montreal
Companies established in 1989
Privately held companies of Canada